Traction may refer to:

Engineering 
Forces:
 Traction (engineering), adhesive friction or force
 Traction vector, in mechanics, the force per unit area on a surface, including normal and shear components
 Traction motor, an electric motor used for propulsion of a vehicle, for example a car or a locomotive
 Railway electric traction, the use of electric motors to propel rail cars
 Traction engine, a self-propelled steam engine

Other uses 
 Traction (agency), San Francisco-based interactive advertising agency
 Traction (orthopedics), a set of mechanisms for straightening broken bones or relieving pressure on the skeletal system
 Traction (organization), a non-profit activism organization in North Carolina
 Traction (album), by New Zealand band Supergroove
 Traction TeamPage, a commercial blog/wiki software platform
 Traction (The Batman), 2nd episode of The Batman
 Traction (geology), a process which transports bed load through a channel

See also
Tracktion